Jonathan Alan Bateson (born 20 September 1989) is an English former professional footballer who played as a right back.

Career
Born in Preston, Lancashire, Bateson began his career in the youth team of Blackburn Rovers, signing on loan for Buxton in December 2008. After leaving Blackburn, Bateson signed for Bradford City, making his debut on 12 August 2009, in a 3–0 loss against Nottingham Forest, in the League Cup. He was sent off in the final minutes for a tackle on Nathan Tyson. Bateson made his Football League debut for Bradford on 5 September 2009. Bateson was released from his contract with Bradford City at the end of the 2009–10 season, having made 21 league appearances for them.

He joined Accrington Stanley in August 2010, following a successful trial at the club.

On 3 March 2011, Bateson joined Conference National side Altrincham on a month loan deal. On 1 April, his loan spell was later extended until the end of that month. He returned to his parent club Accrington Stanley at the end of his loan spell on 30 April 2011. On 23 May 2011, it was announced that Bateson would not be offered a new contract at the end of the 2010–11 season.

On 24 June 2011, Bateson signed for Macclesfield Town. After Macclesfield were relegated into non-League football following the end of the 2011–12 season, Bateson was one of 21 players released by the club.

Bateson moved to Scotland in July 2012, signing for Ross County. He was released by Ross County in December 2012.

Career statistics

References

1989 births
Living people
Footballers from Preston, Lancashire
English footballers
Association football defenders
Blackburn Rovers F.C. players
Buxton F.C. players
Bradford City A.F.C. players
Accrington Stanley F.C. players
Altrincham F.C. players
Macclesfield Town F.C. players
English Football League players
National League (English football) players
Ross County F.C. players